Imbros, officially Gökçeada (lit. Heavenly Island) since 29 July 1970, is the largest island of Turkey and the seat of Gökçeada District of Çanakkale Province. It is located in the north-northeastern Aegean Sea, at the entrance of Saros Bay, and has the westernmost point of Turkey (Cape İncirburnu).

According to the 2021 census, the island-district of Gökçeada has a population of 10,377. The main industries of Imbros are fishing and tourism. By the end of the 20th century, the island was predominantly inhabited by settlers from the Turkish mainland that mostly arrived after 1960, with the indigenous Greek population having declined to about 300 persons by the start of the 21st century.

Historically, the island was primarily inhabited by ethnic Greeks since the Iron Age until approximately the 1960s, when many were forced to emigrate to Greece as well as to Western Europe, the United States and Australia, due to a campaign of discrimination and ethnic cleansing sponsored by the Turkish Democrat Party (DP) government in the 1960s. The Greek Imbriot diaspora is thought to number around 15,000 globally and in Turkey, and has a strong special Imbrian identity. The 2010s saw a tentative revitalisation of the island's remaining Greek community.

Names
The first known name of the island is the Luwian name Imrašša which literally means open field or open country. It is thought that the name Greek name of the island, Imbros comes from the Luwian Imrašša. In Turkish the island is referred to as Gökçeada and sometimes İmroz.

History

In mythology

According to Greek mythology, the palace of Thetis, mother of Achilles, king of Phthia, was situated between Imbros and Samothrace.

The stables of the winged horses of Poseidon were said to lie between Imbros and Tenedos.

Homer wrote in the Iliad:

In the depths of the sea on the cliff
Between Tenedos and craggy Imbros
There is a cave, wide gaping
Poseidon who made the earth tremble,
stopped the horses there.

Eëtion, a lord of or ruler over the island of Imbros, is also mentioned in the Iliad. He buys Priam's captured son Lycaon and restores him to his father. Homer also writes that Hera and Hypnos leave Lemnos and Imbros making their way to Mount Ida. Homer mentions Imbros in the Iliad on other occasions as well.

Imbros is mentioned in the Homeric Hymn which was dedicated to Apollo.

Apollonius of Rhodes also mentions Imbros in the first book of his work Argonautica.

In antiquity
The original inhabitants of Imbros were Pelasgians, worshipped Cabeiri, and Hermes as a god of reproduction in ithyphallic form, whence his Carian epithet, ‘Ιμβραμος, has been supposed to be derived. For ancient Greeks, the islands of Lemnos and Imbros were sacred to Hephaestus, god of metallurgy, and on ancient coins of Imbros an ithyphallic Hephaestus appears.

According to the Edremit Inscription, Imbros (Luwian: Imrašša ) was ruled by the Anatolian kingdom of Mira and Wiluša led by prince Mukšuš during the Late Bronze Age.

In classical antiquity, Imbros, like Lemnos, was an Athenian cleruchy, a colony whose settlers retained Athenian citizenship; although since the Imbrians appear on the Athenian tribute lists, there may have been a division with the native population. The original inhabitants of Imbros were Pelasgians, as mentioned by Herodotus in The Histories.

In 511 or 512 BC the island was captured by the Persian general Otanes. But later, Miltiades conquered the island from Persia after the battle of Salamis; the colony was established about 450 BC, during the first Athenian empire, and was retained by Athens (with brief exceptions) for the next six centuries. Thucydides, in his History of the Peloponnesian War describes the colonization of Imbros, and at several places in his narrative mentions the contribution of Imbrians in support of Athens during various military actions. He also recounts the escape of an Athenian squadron to Imbros.
During the Social War (357–355 BC) the Chians, Rhodians and Byzantians attacked Imbros and Lemnos, which were allies of Athens.
In the late second century A.D., the island may have become independent under Septimius Severus.

Strabo mentions that Cabeiri are most honored in Imbros and Lemnos.

Stephanus of Byzantium mentions that Imbros was sacred to Cabeiri and Hermes.

Imbrian Mysteries were one of the secret religious rites of ancient Greece (similar to the Eleusinian Mysteries). Unfortunately, very little is known about the Imbrian Mysteries.

It is said that Philonomus had sent to Amyclae in Laconia colonists from Imbros and Lemnos.

Philostratus in his "Letter 70" to the Imbrian Cleophon, states that being a Lemnian, he considers Imbros also as his homeland.

Byzantine era

Prior to the Fall of Constantinople, several larger islands south of Imbros were under Genoese rule, part of the territory historically held in the eastern Mediterranean by the independent Maritime Republic of Genoa (1005–1797, thus predating the East–West schism of 1054) a political development emanating from the former territory of the Western Roman Empire, by city-states such as Venice, Pisa and Amalfi.

At the beginning of the 13th century, when the Fourth Crusade and its aftermath temporarily disrupted Venice's relations with the Byzantine Empire, Genoa expanded its influence north of Imbros, into the Black Sea and Crimea.

Ottoman era
After the fall of Constantinople in 1453 the Byzantine forces in Imbros left the island. In the aftermath following the withdrawal, delegates from the island went to İstanbul for an audience with the Ottoman Emperor Mehmed II to discuss terms allowing them to live harmoniously within the Ottoman Empire.

After the island became Ottoman soil in 1455 it was administered by Ottomans and Venetians at various times. During this period, and particularly during the reign of Kanuni Sultan Süleyman (1520–1566), the island became a foundation within the Ottoman Empire. Relations between the Ottomans and Venetians occasionally led to hostilities – for example, in June 1717 during the Turkish-Venetian War (1714-1718), a tough but ultimately fairly indecisive naval battle between a Venetian fleet, under Flangini, and an Ottoman fleet, was fought near Imbros in the Aegean Sea. Nevertheless, the island's residents continued to live in relative peace and prosperity until the 20th century.

In 1912 during the First Balkan War, the Greek Navy invaded the island. The island had an absolute Greek majority population of 8.506 people then. After the signing of the Treaty of Athens in 1913 all of the Aegean islands except Bozcaada and Gökçeada were ceded to Greece.

Only in 1864 with the promulgation of the new Vilâyet Law was the administrative status of the island in regard to the central government defined. Two administrative districts were formed—the Kazâ/Jurisdiction of İmroz and Bozcaada of the Sanjak/District of Lemnos, a subdivision of the larger province of Eyalet/Administrative Division of the Islands of the Ægean Sea. Prominent Ottoman politician, Ismail Qemal Bej Vlora, who spent about a year during the mid-1870s superintending the workings of a lignite mine upon the island, remarked that:“The sole authority in the place was the müdür (a sort of mayor appointed by the Government [whose attributions included tax collection, executing the court sentences, and at times mediation of disputes and pacification of the locals]), who was a charming Albanian, and more like the father of this island family than a representative of government. There were four or five gendarmes recruited from among the Greeks of the country, who did not even know where their arms were, so little did they ever find need of using them —and it is doubtful if they would have known how to if the occasion had arisen…We passed whole weeks without communication with the outside world. No telegrams came, nor couriers, nor newspapers, nor anything else to disturb our hermit's life amid this beautiful scenery and among a population that is perhaps the quietest and simplest in the world. There are no pleasures there except the songs of young Greeks and the country dances.”

First World War

In 1915, Imbros played an important role as a staging post for the allied Mediterranean Expeditionary Force, prior to and during the invasion of the Gallipoli peninsula. A field hospital, airfield and administrative and stores buildings were constructed on the island. In particular, many ANZAC (Australian and New Zealand Army Corps) soldiers were based at Imbros during the Gallipoli campaign, and the island was used as an air and naval base by ANZAC, British, and French forces against Turkey. On Imbros was the headquarters of General Ian Hamilton.

On 20 January 1918, a naval action (see Battle of Imbros (1918)) took place in the Aegean near the island when an Ottoman squadron engaged a flotilla of the British Royal Navy.

Patrick Shaw-Stewart wrote his famous poem "Achilles in the Trench", one of the best-known war poems of the First World War, while he was at the Imbros. He seemed to enjoy speaking ancient Greek to the inhabitants of Imbros. In one of his letters he wrote: "here I am, living in a Greek village and talking the language of Demosthenes to the inhabitants (who are really quite clever at taking my meaning)."

Between Turkey and Greece
Between November 1912 and September 1923, Imbros, together with Tenedos, were under the administration of the Greek navy. Both islands were overwhelmingly ethnically Greek, and in the case of Imbros the population was entirely Greek.

Negotiations to end the Balkan war started in December 1912 in London and the issue of the Aegean islands was one persistent problem. The issue divided the great powers with Germany, Austria-Hungary, and Italy supporting the Ottoman position for return of all the Aegean islands and Britain and France supporting the Greek position for Greek control of all the Aegean islands. With Italy controlling key islands in the region, major power negotiations deadlocked in London and later in Bucharest. Romania threatened military action with the Greeks against the Ottomans in order to force negotiations in Athens in November 1913. Eventually, Greece and Great Britain pressured the Germans to support an agreement where the Ottomans would retain Tenedos, Kastelorizo and Imbros and the Greeks would control the other Aegean islands. The Greeks accepted the plan while the Ottoman Empire rejected the ceding of the other Aegean islands. This agreement would not hold, but the outbreak of World War I and the Turkish War of Independence put the issue to the side.

During World War I Gallipoli Campaign, the British used the island as a supply base and built a 600-metre-long airstrip for military operations.

In 1920, the Treaty of Sèvres with the defeated Ottoman Empire granted the island to Greece. The Ottoman government, which signed but did not ratify the treaty, was overthrown by the new Turkish nationalist Government of Mustafa Kemal Atatürk, based in Ankara. After the Greco-Turkish War ended in Greek defeat in Anatolia, and the fall of Lloyd George and his Middle Eastern policies, the western powers agreed to the Treaty of Lausanne with the new Turkish Republic, in 1923. This treaty made the island part of Turkey; but it guaranteed a special autonomous administrative status for Imbros and Tenedos to accommodate the Greeks, and excluded them from the population exchange that took place between Greece and Turkey, due to their presence there as a majority. Article 14 of the treaty provided specific guarantees safeguarding the rights of minorities in both the nations.

However shortly after the legislation of "Civil Law" on 26 June 1927 (Mahalli Idareler Kanunu), the rights accorded to the Greek population of Imbros and Tenedos were revoked, in violation of the Lausanne Treaty. Thus, the island was demoted from an administrative district to a sub-district which resulted that the island was to be stripped of its local tribunals. Moreover, the members of the local council were obliged to have adequate knowledge of the Turkish language, which meant that the vast majority of the islanders were excluded. Furthermore, according to this law, the Turkish government retained the right to dissolve this council and in certain circumstances, to introduce police force and other officials consisted of non-islanders. This law also violated the educational rights of the local community and imposed an educational system similar to that followed by ordinary Turkish schools.

Massive scale persecution against the local Greek element started in 1961, as part of the Eritme Programmi operation that aimed at the elimination of Greek education and the enforcement of economic, psychological pressure and violence. Under these conditions the Turkish government approved the appropriation of the 90% of the cultivated areas of the island and the settlement of additional 6,000 ethnic Turks from mainland Turkey. The Turkish Government, also, closed the Greek schools on the island and classified it as "supervised zone", which meant that expatriates could not visit the island and their homes without special admission. Greeks on the island were also targeted by the construction of an open prison on the island that included inmates convicted of rape and murder, who were then allowed to roam freely on the island and harass locals. Some are said to have committed the same crimes before the prison was closed down in 1992. Farming land was expropriated for the prison. Furthermore, with the 1964 Law on Land Expropriation (No 6830) the farm property of the Greeks on the island was taken away from their owners.
In 1965, the first mosque was built in the island. It was named Fatih Camii (Conqueror's Mosque) and was built on an expropriated Greek Orthodox communal property at the capital of the island.
Additional population settlements from Anatolia occurred in 1973, 1984 and 2000. The state provided special credit opportunities and agricultural aid in kind to those who would decide to settle in the island. New settlements were created and existing settlements were renamed with Turkish names. The island itself was officially renamed to Gökçeada in 1970. On the other hand, the indigenous Greek population being deprived of its means of production and facing hostile behaviour from the government and the newly arrived settlers, left its native land. The peak of this exodus was in 1974 during the Cyprus crisis.

In 1991, Turkish authorities ended the military "forbidden zone" status on the island.

In 1992, Panimbrian Committee mentioned, that members of the Greek community are "considered by the authorities to be second class citizens" and that the local Greeks are afraid to express their feelings, to protest against certain actions of the authorities or the Turkish settlers, or even to allow anybody to make use of their names when they give some information referring to the violation of their rights, fearing the consequences which they will have to face from the Turkish authorities. In the same year Human Rights Watch report concluded that the Turkish government has denied the rights of the Greek community on Imbros and Tenedos in violation of the Lausanne Treaty and international human rights laws and agreements.

By 2000, only 400 Greeks remained, while the Turks were around 8000. , only 318 Greeks remained on the island, whereas the number of Turks increased to 8,344. However, international pressure resulted in Turkey's authorities relaxing some of the previously imposed restrictions in the 2000s, which, combined with persistent efforts of the Imvrian expatriate communities and the Ecumenical Patriarch Bartholomew, a native of Imbros, allowed the opening of Greek educational establishments on the island as well as the return of some Greeks who had left their native Imbros (in 2019, there were three Greek schools operating on the island, the Greek population of Imbros being over 500 people).

Archaeology 
In November 2019, a team of archaeologists led by Burçin Erdogan unearthed an approximately 8,000-year-old T-shaped obelisk in the Uğurlu-Zeytinlik mound. The monument made of two parts connected by seven-meter long walls reminds standing stones in Göbekli Tepe archeological site.

Geography

Geology
Imbros is mainly of volcanic origin and the highest mountain of the island İlyas Dağ, is an extinct cone-shaped stratovolcano.

Earthquakes
Imbros is situated directly south of the North Anatolian Fault, lying within the Anatolian Plate very close to the boundary between the Aegean Sea and Eurasian Plates. This fault zone, which runs from northeastern Anatolia to the northern Aegean Sea, has been responsible for several deadly earthquakes, including in Istanbul, Izmit and Imbros among others, and is a major threat to the island.

On the days of 20–21 August 1859, Imbros experienced some pre-earthquake tremors. The most catastrophic earthquake hit the island at 04:00 on the morning of the August 21, followed by a series of aftershocks—which were recorded to have had lasted until at least January 1860—the most severe of which were recorded at 16:15, 16:25, and 16:35 of the same day. The damage from these tremors was quite significant, as is evident in the descriptions provided from the newspaper, Αμάλθεια (Amalthea), and Schmidt. The publication, Αμάλθεια stated that: “All the houses in the villages of Παναγία, Γλυκύ, Αγρίδια and Σχοινούδι of Ίμβρος collapsed or suffered cracks from the main earthquake and the three strong aftershocks that followed. The inhabitants remained on the streets and in the fields, without daring to approach the ruins, to get their furniture. Crying and mourning were heard everywhere. The first earthquake knocked down tiles and all the chimneys of the houses. After that the inhabitants left their homes. During the second earthquake, all the houses suffered cracks. The third earthquake caused the collapse of all houses, windmills, watermills, bakeries, and cafes, while churches were severely damaged, but did not collapse. The number of houses that fell was 1400. In various areas, cracks were observed in the ground, from which salt water gushed out, with fine sand. Massive rocks fell from the mountains. The villages of Αγίου Θεοδώρου suffered minor damage. Besides, in Samothrace, these earthquakes were also felt, but no damage was recorded. The same in Τένεδος. In Λήμνος on the contrary, some damage was caused, but it is not known how much. In Λήμνος, however, new sources appeared. In Ίμβρος, the earthquakes continued until the 23rd of the month, but none of the residents were killed.”Schmidt writes that he derives his information about the earthquake mainly from a letter he received in January 1860, after the mediation of Professor Μητσόπουλου, from the deacon Βαρνάβα Κουτλουμουσιανό—an eyewitness to the earthquake. In this letter, it is mentioned that: “It seems that there were no human losses, but in all areas of the island the destruction was great, as many houses and churches were destroyed. Some springs have disappeared, while others have appeared in areas that were previously dry. There were also cracks in the ground, from which mud with a strong sulphur odour came. The earthquake preceded a violent thunder from the north-east.” On 24 May 2014, Imbros was shaken by a strong earthquake with a magnitude of 6.9 MW. 30 people were injured and numerous old houses were damaged, some of them irreparably. A major earthquake is expected to occur along this fault line in the near future. Minor noticeable earthquakes are common.

Climate
The island has a Mediterranean climate with warm and dry summers, and wet and cool winters. Although summer is the driest season, some rainfall does occur in summer. Snow and ground frost are not uncommon in winter.

Town

 Çınarlı  Çınarlı (also known as "Gökçeada" or "Merkez" meaning "center") is the only town on Imbros, known as Panaghia Balomeni (Παναγία Μπαλωμένη) in Greek; there is a small airport nearby.

Villages
Most of the settlements on Imbros were given Turkish names in 1926.
 Bademli köyü  Older Greek name is Gliky (Γλυκύ). It is located to the northeast of the island, between Çınarlı town and Kaleköy/Kastro.
 Dereköy  Older Greek name is Schoinoudi (Σχοινούδι). It is located at the center of the west side of island. Due to the emigration of the Greek population (largely to Australia and the USA; some to Greece and Istanbul before the 1970s), Dereköy is largely empty today. However, many people return on every 15 August for the festival of the Virgin Mary.
 Eşelek / Karaca köyü  It is located at the southeast of the island. It is an agricultural area that produces fruit and vegetables.
 Kaleköy  Older name is Kastro (Κάστρο) (Latin and Greek for castle). Located on the north-eastern coast of island, there is an antique castle near the village. Kaleköy also has a small port which was constructed by the French Navy during the occupation of the island in the First World War, and is now used for fishing-boats and yachts.
 Şahinkaya köyü  It is located near Dereköy.
 Şirinköy  It is located in the southwest of island.
 Tepeköy  Older Greek name is Agridia (Αγρίδια).
 Uğurlu köyü  It is located in the west of the island.
 Yeni Bademli köyü  It is located at the center-northeast of the island, near Bademli. It has many motels and pensions.
 Yenimahalle  Older Greek name is Evlampion (Ευλάμπιον). It is located near the town of Çınarlı on the road to Kuzulimanı port.
 Zeytinliköy  Older Greek name is Agios Theodoros (Άγιος Θεόδωρος). Demetrios Archontonis, known as Ecumenical Patriarch Bartholomew I of Constantinople, was born there on 29 February 1940. The village has beautiful historic Greek houses and gets its Turkish name from the surrounding olive groves (Zeytinli köy meaning "Olive-ville" in Turkish.) The village is very popular among tourists during high season.
 Others  Yeni Bademli köyü, Eşelek / Karaca köyü, Şahinkaya köyü, Şirinköy and Uğurlu köyü were established after 1970.

Cittaslow
Gökçeada is one of the eight "cittaslows" of Turkey and is the second in being accepted as one, after Seferihisar.

Places to see
 Aydıncık/Kefaloz (Kefalos) beach: Best location for windsurfing
 Kapıkaya (Stenos) beach:
 Kaşkaval peninsula / (Kaskaval): Scuba diving
 Kuzulimanı (Haghios Kyrikas): Ferryport with 24-hour ferries to Gelibolu–Kabatepe port and Çanakkale port.
 Mavikoy/Bluebay: The first national underwater park in Turkey. Scuba diving allowed for recreational purposes.
 Marmaros beach: Also has a small waterfall.
 Pınarbaşı (Spilya) beach: Longest (and most sandy) beach on the island.

Environment

Marine

Water from the Black and Marmara Seas mixing with the warmer saltier water of the Aegean Sea supports a rich marine ecosystem.

Wind

Offshore wind power may be developed in future. At the moment, there are some wind turbines generating energy on the island.

Issues

Environmental issues include litter.

Economy

Fishing
Swordfish are caught in season.

Agriculture
Goats are raised.

Tourism
Most tourists visit in summer.

Transport
Former scheduled flights from the airport are not currently flying.

Population

Greek population

The island was primarily inhabited by ethnic Greeks from ancient times through to approximately the 1960s. Data dating from 1922 taken under Greek rule and 1927 data taken under Turkish rule showed a strong majority of Greek inhabitants on Imbros, and the Greek Orthodox Church had a strong presence on the island. The Turkish census of 1927 states that the island's population was exclusively Greek Orthodox and numbered 6,762.

Article 14 of the Treaty of Lausanne (1923) exempted Imbros and Tenedos from the large-scale population exchange that took place between Greece and Turkey, and required Turkey to accommodate the local Greek majority and their rights:

The islands of Imbros and Tenedos, remaining under Turkish sovereignty, shall enjoy a special administrative organisation composed of local elements and furnishing every guarantee for the native non-Moslem population insofar as concerns local administration and the protection of persons and property. The maintenance of order will be assured therein by a police force recruited from amongst the local population by the local administration above provided for and placed under its orders.
 
However, the treaty provisions relating to administrative autonomy for Imbros and protections of minority populations was never implemented by the Turkish government." The result was a significant decline in the Greek population of the island.

A diaspora of approximately 15,000 Imbriots based mostly in Greece maintains strong links to the island. However, large populations of Imbriots reside in Australia, South Africa, Turkey, Egypt, the Americas, and Western Europe.

Human rights

The following grievances apply particularly to Imbros:
 In 1923, Turkey dismissed the elected government of the island, and installed mainlanders. 1,500 Imbriots who had taken refuge from the Turkish War of Independence on Lemnos and in Thessalonica were denied the right to return, as undesirables and their property was confiscated.
 In 1927, the system of local administration on Imbros was abolished, and the Greek schools closed. In 1952–3, the Greek Imbriots were permitted to build new ones, closed again in 1964.
 In 1943, Turkey arrested the Metropolitan of Imbros and Tenedos with other Orthodox clerics. They also confiscated the lands on Imbros belonging to the monasteries of Great Lavra and Koutloumousiou on Mount Athos, expelled the tenants, and installed settlers; when the Mayor of Imbros and four village elders protested, they were arrested and sent to the mainland.
 Between 1964 and 1984, almost all the usable land on Imbros had been expropriated, for inadequate compensation, for an army camp, a minimum-security prison, reforestation projects, a dam project, and a national park.
 Nicholas Palaiopoulos, a town councilor, was arrested and imprisoned in 1962 for complaining to the Greek Ambassador on the latter's visit to Imbros; he, together with the Mayor of Imbros and 20 others, was imprisoned again in 1974.
 The old Cathedral at Kastro (Kaleköy) was desecrated on the night of the Turkish landing on Cyprus in 1974; the present Cathedral was looted in March 1993; criminal activities have included a number of rapes and murders, officially blamed on convicts and soldiers, but none of them has been solved.
 Through the latter half of the 20th century, the Turkish government implemented a program to settle mainland Turks on Imbros and Tenedos (Bozcaada).
 On 28 October 2010, the Greek cemetery of the island was desecrated, an action condemned by the Turkish Ministry of Foreign Affairs.

Population change in Imbros
Discrimination against the island's Greek population as well as geopolitical tensions have led to the Greeks emigrating from both islands, the peak of this exodus occurring in 1974, when Turkey invaded Cyprus. According to 1927 Population Census, Imbros population was 6,555 Greeks, and 157 Turks; in contrast at the 2000 Population Census the Greeks had become a minority on the island. In 2000, there were around 400 Greeks, while there were around 8000 Turks. Most of the former Greeks of Imbros and Tenedos are in diaspora in Greece, the United States, and Australia.

In September 2015, a Greek school on Imbros was reopened after 51 years of prohibition of Greek education.  , there were 14 students, only one of whom was born on the island, the rest from diaspora families that returned to the island. In addition, a member of the Greek community is serving on the Imbros municipal police force .

By 2019, the Greek population of the island had increased to 400, mainly due to increasing numbers of returnees from the diaspora. There are now 3 Greek schools with 53 students.

Culture

A Turkish documentary of 2013, Rüzgarlar (Winds), by Selim Evci, is focused on the discriminatory government policies of the 1960s against the Greek population.

Another Turkish film, My Grandfather's People, is based on the population exchange between Turkey and Greece in 1923. Among other places, some scenes were filmed in Imbros.

Notable people from Imbros

See also
 Treaty of Lausanne
 Greco-Turkish relations
 Treaty of Sèvres
 Tenedos

References

Further reading
 The struggle for justice : 1923–1993 : 70 years of Turkish provocation and violations of the Treaty of Lausanne : a chronicle of human rights violations; Citizen's Association of Constantinople-Imvros-Tenedos-Eastern Thrace of Thrace. Komotini (1993)
 "Greeks look to revive identity on Gökçeada" in Hürriyet Daily News, 22 August 2011.
 Papers presented to the II. National Symposium on the Aegean Islands, 2–3 July 2004, Gökçeada, Çanakkale.

External links

 Official website of the Gökçeada District 
 Official website of the Gökçeada Municipality 
 Gökçeada Airport 
 Gökçeada Rehberim / Imbros Guide 
 The Greeks of Imbros, video of the book İmroz Rumları / Gökçeada Üzerine, a film directed by Yannis Katomeris, 

 
Islands of Turkey
North Aegean islands
Thracian Sea
Islands of Çanakkale Province
Populated places in Çanakkale Province
Ancient Greek archaeological sites in Turkey
Locations in the Iliad
Discrimination in Turkey
Greece–Turkey relations
Members of the Delian League
Populated places in the ancient Aegean islands
Cittaslow